Ismelys Milagros Del Valle Velásquez Lugo (born August 26, 1999) is a Venezuelan model, TV host and beauty queen. She is the winner of the beauty titles of Miss Mesoamerica 2021, Reinado Internacional del Café 2022 and Miss Supranational Venezuela 2022.

Life and career 

Velásquez was born in La Guaira, Venezuela, on August 26, 1999. She is a student of International Studies at the Central University of Venezuela in Caracas.

Beauty contests

Queen of Venezuelan cocoa 
On October 4, 2018, Velásquez was chosen as Queen of Venezuelan cocoa.

International Cocoa Kingdom 
In October 2019, Velásquez participated in the first edition of the International Cocoa Reign, held at the Caracas polyhedron where she obtained the position of second runner-up.

Miss Venezuela 2020 
Ismelys participated in the Miss Venezuela 2020 beauty pageant that was held in Caracas, Venezuela, where she represented the state of La Guaira, classifying herself among the ten (10) semifinalists of the contest.

Miss Mesoamerica 2021 
On July 24, 2021, Velásquez won the title of Miss Mesoamerica 2021 in San Salvador (El Salvador), being the second Venezuelan to obtain the crown.

Reinado Internacional del Café 2022 (The International Pageant for Coffee 2022) 
Velásquez obtained the crown, from the Reinado Internacional del Café contest, which took place on January 8, 2022 within the framework of the Manizales Fair held in the city of Manizales (Colombia), where she became the fifth Venezuelan to obtain the crown.

Miss Supranational Venezuela 2022 
On June 9, 2022, she was crowned Miss Supranational Venezuela 2022.

Miss Supranational 2022 
Velásquez represented Venezuela at the 13th edition of the Miss Supranational 2022 pageant, held on July 15, 2022 at Strzelecki Park Amphitheater in Nowy Sącz, Małopolska, Poland and finished as 4th Runner-up.

References

External links
 

Living people
1999 births
Venezuelan beauty pageant winners